Miriam Lichtheim (3 May 1914, Istanbul – 27 March 2004, Jerusalem) was a Turkish-born American-Israeli Egyptologist, known for her translations of ancient Egyptian texts.

Biography
Miriam was born in Istanbul on May 3, 1914, to Richard Lichtheim – a German-born Jewish politician, publicist, and notable Zionist – and his wife Irene (née Hafter), a Sephardic Jew whose first language was Greek. Her older brother, born 1912, was the British Marxist journalist George Lichtheim. From 1913 to 1917, Richard Lichtheim was the successor to Victor Jacobson, representative of the Zionist World Organization in Istanbul. Due to suspicions of espionage, the Lichtheim family returned to Germany in 1919 following the end of World War I.

In 1934, the family emigrated to Palestine, where Miriam studied under Hans Jakob Polotsky in the Hebrew University in Jerusalem. In a paper of recollections about her teacher, she recalls that, at the beginning of the year, in Polotsky's Egyptian class there were four students; at the end, only she remained. During Miriam's time at the Hebrew University, her father Richard became the representative of the World Zionist Organisation at the League of Nations, and relocated to Geneva with Irene. They would return in 1946 following the end of World War II and the founding of Israel.

After completing her studies, Miriam travelled to the United States in 1941 where she studied and received a Ph.D. in Egyptology from the University of  Chicago. She worked as an academic librarian first at Yale University, and then at the University of California, Los Angeles, where she was Near East Bibliographer and Lecturer until her retirement in 1974.

In 1982 she returned to Israel, where she taught at her old school the Hebrew University of Jerusalem. She died in 2004.

Works 
In 1973, she published the first volume of the Ancient Egyptian Literature (abbr. AEL), annotated translations of Old and Middle Kingdom texts.  In this work, she describes the genesis and evolution of different literary genres in Egypt, based on ostraca, inscriptions engraved in stone, and texts of papyri. In 1976, the second volume of AEL containing New Kingdom texts appeared, followed in 1980 by the third dealing with the first millennium BCE literature. These widely used anthologies became classics in the field of Egyptology, portraying the evolution of literature in ancient Egypt.

Publications (selection)
 With Elizabeth Stefanski, 1952: Coptic Ostraca from Medinet Habu. Oriental Institute Publications 71. Chicago: The University of Chicago Press.
 1963: "Ancient Egypt: A survey of current historiography", The American Historical Review 69 (1), 30–46. DOI: 10.2307/1904412.
 1973–1980 (and reprints): Ancient Egyptian literature. A book of readings, 3 volumes, The University of California Press.
 1983: Late Egyptian wisdom literature in the international context: a study of Demotic instructions. Orbis Biblicus et Orientalis 52. Freiburg (Schweiz); Göttingen: Universitätsverlag; Vandenhoeck & Ruprecht. 
 1988: Ancient Egyptian autobiographies chiefly of the Middle Kingdom: A study and an anthology. Orbis Biblicus et Orientalis 84. Freiburg (Schweiz); Göttingen: Universitätsverlag; Vandenhoeck & Ruprecht.
 1992: Maat in Egyptian Autobiographies and Related Studies. Orbis Biblicus et Orientalis 120. Freiburg (Schweiz); Göttingen: Universitätsverlag; Vandenhoeck & Ruprecht.
 1997: Moral Values in Ancient Egypt. Orbis Biblicus et Orientalis 155. Freiburg (Schweiz); Göttingen: Universitätsverlag; Vandenhoeck & Ruprecht.
 1999: Telling it Briefly: A Memoir of My Life. Freiburg (Schweiz): Universitätsverlag.

References 

Israeli Egyptologists
University of Chicago alumni
Turkish Sephardi Jews
1914 births
2004 deaths
20th-century American women writers
Academic staff of the Hebrew University of Jerusalem
University of California, Los Angeles faculty
American women academics
German expatriates in the Ottoman Empire
German emigrants to Mandatory Palestine
Mandatory Palestine emigrants to the United States
Archaeologists from Istanbul
Hebrew University of Jerusalem alumni
American Egyptologists
American papyrologists
Jewish women writers
Israeli women academics
Academic librarians
American women archaeologists
Israeli women archaeologists
Israeli people of German-Jewish descent
Israeli people of Greek-Jewish descent